Goreng may refer to:

Indonesian and Malaysian word referring to fried food:
Indonesian cuisine
Malaysian cuisine
Singaporean cuisine
Goreng people
Goreng language, an extinct Australian Aboriginal language

See also
Goreng goreng